The following table indicates the party of elected officials in the U.S. state of Maine:
 Governor

The table also indicates the historical party composition in the:
 State Senate
 State House of Representatives
 State delegation to the U.S. Senate
 State delegation to the U.S. House of Representatives

For years in which a presidential election was held, the table indicates which party's nominees received the state's electoral votes.

History

The Republican Party controlled the governorship from the American Civil War to 1932, with the Democratic Party only winning four times. The Greenback Party was active in Maine and its gubernatorial candidates had their vote totals rise from 520 votes in the 1876 election to 41,371 votes in the 1878 election. The Greenbacks aided in the election of Democratic gubernatorial nominees Alonzo Garcelon and Harris M. Plaisted. The Democratic Party did not control the state legislature between 1847 and 1911.

The Maine Republican Party supported Theodore Roosevelt during the 1912 Republican presidential primaries against President William Howard Taft. The Maine Progressive Party was founded by Roosevelt supporters on July 31, 1912, at a convention in Portland, Maine. The Republicans were weakened after losing members including Charles H. Hitchborn, who was the treasurer of the party, although Warren C. Philbrook, the chair of the party, remained. Woodrow Wilson won Maine in the presidential election while Roosevelt received more votes than Taft.

On April 5, 1916, the Progressives held their convention and nominated Edwin Lawrence for governor under the coniditon that they would follow the path of the national party. The national Progressive Party attempted to nominate Roosevelt for president against, but he declined and the party returned to the Republicans. The Maine Progressives withdrew their candidates and supported the Republicans. B. F. Lawrence, who ran for a seat in the Maine House of Representatives, was the only Progressive elected in 1916, but later joined the Republicans.

Robert M. La Follette, who ran as the Progressive presidential nominee in the 1924 election, told Gilbert E. Roe, who was running his campaign in the eastern United States, that the conditions for his campaigns were good in the eastern United States except for in Maine and Vermont. Republican nominee Calvin Coolidge received over 70% of the popular vote while La Follette only received six percent.

Table

See also
 Law and government in Maine

References

Politics of Maine
Government of Maine
Maine